Alexander Zverev defeated the defending champion Daniil Medvedev in the final, 6–4, 6–4 to win the singles tennis title at the 2021 ATP Finals. It was his second ATP Finals title. With the win, Zverev ended a six-year streak of different winners at the tournament, dating to 2015.

Hubert Hurkacz, Casper Ruud, Jannik Sinner (as an alternate replacing Matteo Berrettini) and Cameron Norrie (as an alternate replacing Stefanos Tsitsipas) made their tournament debuts. Sinner became the youngest player to win a Tour Finals match since Lleyton Hewitt in 2000. He was the youngest to compete since Juan Martín del Potro in 2008 and the first alternate to win a match since Janko Tipsarević in 2011.

Novak Djokovic was attempting to tie Roger Federer's record of six Tour Finals titles, but was defeated in the semifinals by Zverev.

Seeds

Alternates

Draw

Finals

Green group

Red group

† Following ATP rules, Berrettini's retirement against Zverev was counted as a straight-set loss in determining round robin standings.

Standings are determined by: 1. number of wins; 2. number of matches played; 3. in two-players-ties, head-to-head records; 4. in three-players-ties, percentage of sets won, then percentage of games won; 5. ATP rankings.

References

External links 
Official website
Group standings
Singles draw

Singles